Dragoş Adrian Pitu (born 31 August 1975 in Constanţa) is a retired Romanian football player. His nephew, Alexi is also a footballer.

References

External links

1975 births
Living people
Romanian footballers
Association football midfielders
FCV Farul Constanța players
FC Sportul Studențesc București players
ASC Oțelul Galați players
FC Dinamo București players
AFC Rocar București players
FC U Craiova 1948 players
FC Steaua București players
CS Portul Constanța players
Bnei Sakhnin F.C. players
Maccabi Netanya F.C. players
Romanian expatriate footballers
Expatriate footballers in Israel
Liga I players